La Bañeza Fútbol Club is a Spanish football team based in La Bañeza, in the autonomous community of Castile and León. Founded in 1956 as La Bañeza Club de Fútbol, the club changed to its current name in 1984. It plays in Tercera División – Group 8, holding home matches at Estadio La Llanera.

Season to season

37 seasons in Tercera División

References

External links
 
ArefePedia team profile 
Soccerway team profile

Football clubs in Castile and León
Association football clubs established in 1956
1956 establishments in Spain
Province of León